Triplophysa fuxianensis is a species of stone loach in the genus Triplophysa endemic to Fuxian Lake in Yunnan, China. It grows to  SL.

References

F
Freshwater fish of China
Endemic fauna of Yunnan
Fish described in 1990